Souk Erbaa El Saghir (Arabic:سوق الربع الصغير) or the small Souk Erbaa is one of the souks of the medina of Sfax.

Localization 
Souk Erbaa El Saghir represents and extension for Souk El Hannatine.
According to Boubaker Abdelkafi, originally this souk was basically a group of stables that by the time, got converted into workshops for making chain for weavers.

References 

Erbaa El Saghir